Nairobi Half Life is a 2012 Kenyan drama film directed by David "Tosh" Gitonga. The film was selected as the Kenyan entry for the Best Foreign Language Oscar at the 85th Academy Awards, but did not make the final shortlist, and is the first time Kenya has submitted a film in this category.

At the 33rd Durban International Film Festival, Joseph Wairimu won the award for Best Actor. He also won the Africa Movie Academy Award for Most Promising Actor from the Awards 9th ceremony. It won the most awards at Africa Magic Viewers Choice Awards 2014.

Plot
A young man, Mwas (Joseph Wairimu) still lives with his parents in their rural home in Kenya. He makes a living by selling western action films, he dramatically acts and portrays most of the action figures in his films in order to entice his customers. He is an aspiring actor, and when he comes across a group of actors from Nairobi performing in his town, he asks one of them to help him jump start his acting career. But, in return, he is asked to give ksh1000 (approximately US$10) in order for him to be cast in one of the plays. He can only afford ksh500 and is told to take the other 500 with him to the National Theatre in Nairobi.  He is very excited, and, after receiving some money from his mother, he embarks on his journey to Nairobi with a brief stop over in his town to bade his friends goodbye.  He meets his cousin (a gang leader) who gives Mwas an expensive radio system and some money to take to Khanji electronic shop in downtown Nairobi.

After making his way to Nairobi, he quickly learns that there is more to Nairobi than just opportunities and glamour. On the first day, Mwas loses everything he has brought to Nairobi after he is assaulted by thugs who leave him stranded, confused, and lonely. He gets arrested and even spends a day in jail. In a twist of events, he meets a Nairobi crook Oti (Olwenya Maina) who becomes a close friend and takes him into his criminal gang. The gang itself specializes in snatch and grab thievery with vehicle parts being their main targets.  During this time, Mwas auditions and successfully lands a part in a local play set up by Phoenix Players. He finds himself struggling and juggling the two separate worlds. Mwas finally meets his cousin again who ends up forcing him to steal a car in order to clear his debt. He convinces the gang to move up from stealing parts to stealing cars in order to earn more. Carjacking proved to be a very dangerous activity after the first attempt ends up getting Mwas and a fellow gang member of Oti`s gang being injured in a fight at the meeting place.Later on the carjackings goes successfully, yielding profits that the members share with each other. A misunderstanding breaks out between Oti`s gang and the other one run by a gang leader that ultimately leads to the death of the latter, who died by being impaled by a sharp object when Mwas started confronting with him. This attracts the attention of the police and the two parties are arrested but two corrupt law enforcement officers singles out Oti`s crew and takes them to a secret location which seems abandoned. It was a site of execution to rub off the traces of unsolved Nairobi Crimes. A skirmish erupts leading to the wipeout of the whole crew but Mwas survives.During that time, he falls in love with Oti's onscreen love interest Amina, coming to see her at the lodgings at which she receives customers and even taking her out to the films.

Cast
 Joseph Wairimu as Mwas
 Olwenya Maina as Oti
 Nancy Wanjiku Karanja as Amina
 Mugambi Nthiga as Cedric
 Paul Ogola as Mose
 Antony Ndung'u as Waf
 Johnson Gitau Chege as Kyalo
 Kamau Ndungu as John Waya
 Abubakar Mwenda as Dingo
 Mburu Kimani as Daddy M
 Mehul Savani as Khanji
 Maina Joseph as Kimachia

Reception
The Hollywood Reporter's Todd McCarthy praised the film after watching it at the 2012 AFI Fest: "This dynamic crime drama comes across as fundamentally honest and vividly realistic." KenyaBuzz singled out the show-stealing raw performance by Maina Olwenya as Oti saying: "This character is more ghetto than listening to old NWA albums. He speaks with a criminal confidence and walks like he owns the city despite being a common criminal."

At the 2014 Africa Magic Viewers Choice Awards in March 2014, Nairobi Half Life received awards for:
 Best Cinematographer (Christian Almesberger) 
 Best Lighting Designer (Mohamed Zain)
 Best Make-Up Artist (Elayne Okaya) and
 Best Art Director (Barbara Minishi).

See also
 List of submissions to the 85th Academy Awards for Best Foreign Language Film
 List of Kenyan submissions for the Academy Award for Best Foreign Language Film

References

External links
 

2012 films
2012 drama films
2012 crime drama films
Kenyan drama films
English-language Kenyan films
Swahili-language films
Films set in Kenya
Best Sound Africa Movie Academy Award winners